Turinyphia is a genus of sheet weavers that was first described by P. J. van Helsdingen in 1982.

Species
 it contains four species:
Turinyphia cavernicola Wunderlich, 2008 – Azores
Turinyphia clairi (Simon, 1884) (type) – Southern Europe
Turinyphia maderiana (Schenkel, 1938) – Madeira
Turinyphia yunohamensis (Bösenberg & Strand, 1906) – China, Korea, Japan

See also
 List of Linyphiidae species (Q–Z)

References

Araneomorphae genera
Linyphiidae
Spiders of Asia
Spiders of Macaronesia